A Divorce (Spanish: Un divorcio) is a 1953 Mexican drama film directed by Emilio Gómez Muriel and starring Marga López, Carlos López Moctezuma, and Elda Peralta.

The film's art direction was by Francisco Marco Chillet.

Cast
     Marga López  as Cristina Fuentes  
 Carlos López Moctezuma  as Alberto Luna  
 Elda Peralta as Berta  
 Raúl Farell as Luciano 
 Julio Villarreal as Sacerdote  
 María Gentil Arcos as Pilar  
 Elisa Quintanilla as Lupita  
 Armando Velasco as Mayordomo  
 Elodia Hernández  
 Rodolfo Calvo  
 Emilio Girón  
 María Victoria Llamas  as Maruja  
 Cristina Trevi  
 Magda Donato  as Abuela de Maruja  
 Mario Sevilla  as Amigo de Alberto  
 José María Linares-Rivas  as Señor Saldivar 
 Victorio Blanco  as Empleado boliche  
 Ángel Merino as Hombre en biblioteca  
 Alicia Montoya  as Mujer en iglesia

References

Bibliography 
 María Luisa Amador. Cartelera cinematográfica, 1950-1959. UNAM, 1985.

External links 
 

1953 films
1953 drama films
Mexican drama films
1950s Spanish-language films
Films directed by Emilio Gómez Muriel
Mexican black-and-white films
1950s Mexican films